Brian C. Mushimba is an engineer who formerly served in the cabinet of the Zambian government under President Edgar Lungu's rule. Before entering public service in 2016 , he studied, graduated and practiced engineering in the United States, Europe and around Africa with increasing responsibilities to become a Regional Director/CEO In the electricity sector.

Prior to being appointed into cabinet, Mushimba was asked to stand and won the elections to become a member of Parliament and represent his home district. Mushimba's priorities as a member of Parliament have been around improving access to education, Healthcare and employment opportunities for his district. At a national level, and drawing on his vast energy background, he has focused on Energy issues in supporting government's agenda for increased energy security with market friendly energy policies.

Through his foundation, he launched a "Mushimba Academic Scholarship" in 2017/2018 to take back to school all vulnerable kids in the district he represented that had dropped out of school due to lack of financial sponsorship, many of them due to being orphaned. In its first year, the scholarship sponsored 130 students at a cost of K236, 000 ($24,000). Further, recognizing the challenge of putting three meals on the table per day in the district, Mushimba started a farmer input support program that in its first year supported local farmers with farming inputs from fertilizers to seeds totaling k130,000 ($13,000); all these programs were funded from personal funds from Mushimba.

Early life and education
Mushimba was born in Mufulira, Zambia. Being one of the best student at primary and junior secondary schools in Mufulira, he was admitted and completed his secondary education, 'O' levels and 'A' levels, at Mpelembe Secondary School, a boarding school that boasted as the best high school in Zambia. Continuing his academic brilliance and upon successful completion of his 'A' levels (Form Six), he proceeded on the academic scholarship by the Zambia Consolidated Copper Mines (ZCCM) to the University of Arizona in the United States where he earned an undergraduate degree in engineering. He subsequently received graduate degrees in business administration while in USA before returning to his home country. In Zambia, he completed his PhD in Environmental Engineering from the University of Zambia. His doctoral dissertation was focused on climate change mitigation and Decarbonation titled " Viability of carbon-neutral energy sources in pyroprocesses; waste to energy conversion."

Career
Upon graduating from the University of Arizona, Mushimba joined Siemens Power Generation in Atlanta, Georgia, USA as an electrical controls engineer. He subsequently worked for Lafarge in Atlanta before being transferred to Zambia. Between 2012 and 2013, he would work for Pratt & Whitney Power Systems in East Hartford, Connecticut as their Product Line Manager for the Aeroderivative Gas Turbine Business line. He then joined Eskom, the state electricity utility of South Africa, as their Technical Director and worked there up to 2016 before Statkraft, the state electricity utility of Norway, operating as SN Power, hired him as their Regional Executive for the African market. He would only stay in this role for a few months as he transitioned into public office by standing and winning a parliamentary seat for his childhood community of Kankoyo in the 2016 general elections. He subsequently was appointed into cabinet.

Personal life
Mushimba is of the Christian faith. He is married to Brenda Mushimba and they have two young sons,

References

Living people
Members of the National Assembly of Zambia
1974 births
Transport ministers of Zambia
Zambian engineers
People from Mufulira
University of Zambia alumni
University of Arizona alumni